Mediaocean is an advertising services and software company, headquartered in New York City.

History 
Mediaocean was founded in 2012 through the merger of advertising technology companies Donovan Data Systems and MediaBank, which the companies announced the year before. Vista Equity Partners acquired a majority stake in Mediaocean in 2015.

In September 2017, Mediaocean announced its partnership with 4C in order to improve cross-channel marketing.

In 2020, the company employed 1200 people. Also in 2018, Vista Equity Partner explored a sale of Mediaocean.

In 2019, Mediaocean added the SpotX platform to its system and signed a contract with WideOrbit, a TV programmatic company.

In January 2020, Mediaocean acquired Paris-based media management software provider MBS.

In July 2020, Mediaocean announced the acquisition of Chicago-based data science and media technology company 4C Insights.

In July 2021, Mediaocean announced the acquisition of advertising server company Flashtalking.

Corporate affairs

Leadership 
Mediaocean is managed by CEO Bill Wise. Other key executives are:

 Nick Galassi, co-founder & CFO
 John Nardone, President

Products and services 
The company provides advertising purchasing, accounting, communication, advertising integration, and other services, such as DARE. Mediaocean handles over $150 billion of advertising spending a year. As of 2013, it also provides advertising statistics to customers, through integration of AOL's online advertising with its own TV-based services.

References

External links 
 mediaocean.com

American companies established in 2012
Companies based in New York City
Multinational companies
Information technology companies of the United States
Online advertising
2012 establishments in New York City